"Musik Non Stop" is a song by Swedish alternative rock band Kent. It was released in November 1999 as the first single from the album Hagnesta Hill.

The song won the Rockbjörnen award in the "Swedish song of the year 1999" category.

Track listing

CD Maxi
 Musik non stop (4:35)
 Bas riff (3:33)
 Önskar att någon... (3:57)

Promo CD
 Musik non stop

Charts

References

Kent (band) songs
1999 singles
1999 songs
Songs written by Joakim Berg
RCA Victor singles